Spilarctia nydia is a moth in the family Erebidae. It was described by Arthur Gardiner Butler in 1875. It is found in Nepal, China (Zhejiang, Jiangsu, Jiangxi, Fujian, Guangdong, Yunnan), Taiwan and northern Vietnam.

Subspecies
Spilarctia nydia nydia (Nepal)
Spilarctia nydia tienmushanica Daniel, 1943 (China: Zhejiang, Jiangsu, Jiangxi, Fujian, Guangdong, Yunnan)
Spilarctia nydia werneri Kishida, 1991 (Taiwan)

References

N
Moths of Asia
Lepidoptera of Nepal
Fauna of the Himalayas
Fauna of Tibet
Moths described in 1875